Members of the Middleton family have been related to the British royal family by marriage since the wedding of Catherine Middleton and Prince William in April 2011, when she became the Duchess of Cambridge. The couple has three children, George, Charlotte and Louis. Tracing their origins back to the Tudor era, the Middleton family of Yorkshire of the late 18th century were recorded as owning property of the Rectory Manor of Wakefield. The land passed down to solicitor William Middleton who established the family law firm in Leeds which spanned five generations. Some members of the firm inherited woollen mills after the First World War. By the turn of the 20th century, the Middleton family had married into the British nobility and, by the 1920s, the family were playing host to the British royal family.

History
By the late Georgian era, the Middleton family were established in the West Riding of Yorkshire as cultural and civic figures, particularly in the legal profession. The law firm Messrs Middleton & Sons was founded in Leeds in 1834 by gentleman farmer and solicitor William Middleton, Esq. (1807–1884) of Gledhow Grange-Hawkhills Estate. One of his sons, solicitor Arthur Middleton (1846–1907), inherited Hawkhills from his father.

William Middleton's descendants include his grandson (Richard) Noël Middleton (1878–1951), a solicitor, director of the family woollen manufacturing firm and co-founder of the Yorkshire Symphony Orchestra. Noël Middleton's youngest son was Captain Peter Francis Middleton, who was Prince Philip's co-pilot on a tour of South America. Peter Middleton's second son is entrepreneur Michael Francis Middleton, who married Carole Goldsmith in 1980 and subsequently relocated to Berkshire. The couple's mail-order supply company Party Pieces, founded in 1987, is estimated to be worth £30 million. Their children are: Catherine Elizabeth, Princess of Wales, socialite and columnist Philippa Charlotte Matthews and businessman James William Middleton. The Middletons purchased Bucklebury Manor in 2012.

Aristocratic ties
Robert Lacey describes the Middleton family as having aristocratic kinship. The Middletons were "friends of British royalty" to whom, in their civic capacity, they "played host as long ago as 1926". The great-grandfather of Catherine, Princess of Wales, Noël Middleton, and his elder brother, photographer and civil engineer Captain William Middleton (1874–1940) reportedly wed their fiancées in Leeds at Mill Hill Chapel in the years before the First World War. Mrs William Middleton (née Agnes Clara Talbot) was the niece of Sir James Kitson, 1st Baronet (later 1st Baron Airedale), who led the chapel's congregation at this time, while Mrs Noël Middleton (née Olive Christiana Lupton) was the first cousin-once-removed of Baroness von Schunck (née Kate Lupton), and the second cousin of Baroness Airedale (née Florence von Schunck) and of Lady Bullock (née Barbara Lupton).

Two of the grandchildren of William Middleton (1807-1884) were solicitor Henry Dubs Middleton (1880–1932), a Charterhouse alumnus, and Gertrude Middleton (1876–1942), educated at St Leonards School, who were both students at the University of Oxford between 1899–1903; Gertrude, the "wealthy" sister of Noël Middleton, studied at St Anne's College while her cousin studied law at University College. Henry served as Chairman of Leeds General Infirmary where he played host to Princess Mary in 1932. He was married to golfer Jane Middleton (née Berney) (1878–1964), a daughter of Sir Henry Hanson Berney, 9th Baronet. Their sons were Ralph Middleton (1908–1990), who was, like their father, a solicitor who later headed the family law firm, and cricketer Cecil Middleton (1911–1984).

Family law and woollen manufacturing firms
Many relatives of Michael Middleton (father of the Princess of Wales) were solicitors in the Leeds-based family firm, Messrs Middleton & Sons. His grandfather Noël Middleton, great-grandfather John William Middleton, Esq. (1839–1887), and great-great-grandfather William Middleton, Esq., as well as many other Middleton relatives, were all solicitors at the law firm which William had established in 1834.

William Middleton's great-grandson John Alfred Middleton (later Middleton-Joy, 1895–1975), son of solicitor Gilbert Middleton, studied at Winchester College and Christ Church, Oxford where he gained a legal qualification in jurisprudence. He and his wife were members of Ascot Heath. Reportedly one of "the keenest women in Leeds on horse-racing matters", Mrs John Alfred Middleton-Joy and her husband dined alongside fellow racing enthusiasts Princess Mary and her husband, the Earl of Harewood, at a Tangiers hotel in February 1934. Middleton-Joy's elder brother, solicitor Alan Lomas Middleton (1893–1970), was also an Oxford graduate and enjoyed membership of the Yorkshire Ramblers' Club as did their uncle, Noël Middleton. 

Noël Middleton was also a director of William Lupton & Co., the Leeds textile manufacturing firm his wife, Olive, had inherited in 1921. His two elder sons, Christopher Maurice Middleton (later Lupton)—an alumnus of Cambridge University's Emmanuel College—and Anthony John Middleton, worked at the family's manufacturing firm.

Described by Tina Brown as being at the "top level of the legal profession in Leeds", Middleton & Co. existed for over 150 years, closing in 1985.

Michael Middleton's niece, Lucy Middleton, is a London-based solicitor and a godparent of Prince Louis.

Political connections 
Michael Middleton's great-grandfather, politician Francis Martineau Lupton, was the first cousin of Mayor of Birmingham Sir Thomas Martineau whose nephew was Prime Minister Neville Chamberlain.

Parents of Michael Middleton
Michael Middleton's father was commercial pilot and RAF officer Captain Peter Francis Middleton (1920–2010).

His boyhood in Leeds saw Peter Middleton share a governess with his second cousins, Dr Francis G. H. Lupton  (1921–2006) and Arthur Ralph Ransome Lupton (1924–2009), both nephews of Arthur Ransome.

As all three of Middleton's maternal uncles died in the First World War, the family estate, Beechwood, was inherited by his grandfather's younger brother, Arthur Greenhow Lupton (1850–1930), and later controlled by his spinster daughters, Dr Elinor Gertrude Lupton (1886–1979), a Lady Mayoress of Leeds, and Elizabeth Lupton (1888–1977). Francis Lupton's 2001 book, The Next Generation: A Sequel to The Lupton Family in Leeds by C.A. Lupton contains Middleton's memoirs in which he recalls the "even greater ordeal of the annual Beechwood Party, for which I still remember the horrors of trying to tie a black bow tie for my first dinner jacket. Nor will I forget my terror of Lady Bryce", the aunt of his mother's first cousins, sisters Elinor and Elizabeth. Middleton wrote that he was "somewhat in awe" of his unmarried cousins who shared a love of animal husbandry with their friend Princess Mary. The two sisters also shared great-grandparents with Beatrix Potter.

Middleton boarded at Clifton College and then studied English at New College, Oxford. After leaving in 1940 he served as a RAF fighter pilot during the Second World War. Commissioned as a pilot officer (on probation) in the RAFVR on 9 March 1941, Middleton was confirmed in his rank and promoted to flying officer (war-substantive) on 9 March 1942. In May 1942, he was posted to No 37 Service Flying School in Calgary, Canada where he spent two-and-a-half years as an instructor, training Spitfire, Hurricane and Lancaster pilots. On 9 March 1943, he received a promotion to flight lieutenant (war-substantive). After joining the reservist 605 Squadron at Manston, near Ramsgate in Kent, in August 1944, Middleton flew a de Havilland Mosquito fighter bomber, nudging the wings of unmanned German V1 flying aircraft to divert them from hitting London. After the war, Middleton joined British European Airways as a pilot, but remained in the reconstituted RAFVR, receiving a reserve commission as a flying officer on 12 August 1949. Promoted to flight lieutenant on 1 March 1951, he relinquished his reserve commission on 12 August 1959.

On a two-month tour of South America in 1962, Prince Philip piloted 49 of the tour's 62 flights with Peter Middleton as his co-pilot, to whom he sent a letter of thanks and a pair of gold cufflinks. British Pathé newsreel captured the two men during the tour. Middleton met his granddaughter's fiancé, Prince William, on his 90th birthday and William attended his funeral in November 2010.

Michael's mother, Valerie (née Glassborow, 1924–2006) was the daughter of bank manager Frederick Glassborow and his wife, Constance (née Robinson). She and her twin sister Mary were born in Marseille and grew up in France. They were bilingual. Valerie attended an English boarding school and later studied at a private secretarial college. Valerie Middleton served as a VAD nurse during the Second World War and in August 2020, in commemoration of the British Red Cross, her granddaughter, Catherine, Princess of Wales, shared a "personal family photo" of her grandmother wearing her British Red Cross uniform.

Valerie Middleton also worked at the Government Code and Cypher School in Bletchley Park where a memorial commemorates her work as a code-breaker. Her colleague and friend, Lady Body (née Marion Graham), recalled in 2014 that she had shared a "rather special moment" with Valerie: "Our superior officer, Commander Williams, came into the room smiling and he said, 'Well done, girls. A signal has been intercepted from Tokyo to Geneva and it's the signal that the Japanese are surrendering'. He told us that a message has gone to the King and the Prime Minister but that it could not be announced until Geneva has sent on the message to London".

Grandparents of Michael Middleton
Trust funds had been established from the fortunes of Michael Middleton's grandmother, heiress Olive Christiana Middleton (1881–1936), a member of the Lupton family. Olive studied at Roedean School and was accepted at the University of Cambridge. She was in the procession of dignitaries accompanying Princess Mary in Headingley in 1927 and on the princess' fundraising committee for the Leeds General Infirmary.

Olive's husband was Leeds-born (Richard) Noël Middleton (1878–1951), who boarded at Clifton College until 1896. Although accepted to study at New College, Oxford, he chose to commence his legal training in Leeds whilst attending law lectures at Victoria University. 

Middleton "married the aristocrat"—Olive—at the Mill Hill Chapel in Leeds in 1914.

Associated with High Church Anglicanism, members of the Middleton family were close to the Venerable Archdeacon J.B. Seaton (Oxford)  who, in 1921,  officiated at the funeral of Noël's brother, Gilbert  and at the wedding of Gilbert's  daughter  Margaret  in Leeds in 1925 and his son Alan's wedding in 1926 at St. Mary Abbots Church, Kensington at which the groomsmen reportedly included Alan's brother John  and their uncle  Noël Middleton.  In 1914, Noël, his brother Gilbert and other members of his family were reportedly guests at the  funeral of Seaton's mentor, Samuel Rolles Driver, and partook in the "procession from the deceased's lodgings  in Tom Quad, Christ Church, Oxford" where  Noël's nephew,  John Middleton, was offered  a place that year.

Noël Middleton was a co-founder of the Yorkshire Symphony Orchestra and a regular guest at musical soirées at Harewood House, home of Princess Mary, Princess Royal. He was reported in November 1949 as representing the Leeds Musical Festival Committee when conversing with the Princess and her son, George Lascelles, 7th Earl of Harewood at the Leeds Civic Hall.

Olive Middleton's family had contributed to the political life of both the UK and to the civic life of Leeds, especially in the areas of education, housing, and public health, for several generations. Her father, Francis Martineau Lupton, was a landowner and lead magistrate who dealt with probate matters for the Leeds and West Riding Court. The 1899 House of Commons Parliamentary Papers record Lupton as being instrumental in establishing a Parliamentary Inquiry into the religious education for dissenting Protestants.

In June 1914, Olive and her sister-in-law Gertrude—"Mrs Middleton and Miss Middleton"—and Olive's second cousin "Miss Lupton" (later Lady Bullock) were reported as guests at the First and Third Trinity Boat Club May Ball. Olive Middleton was close to the Hon. Doris Kitson, daughter of her second cousin, Florence (née von Schunck), and Albert Kitson, 2nd Baron Airedale, and attended society balls at their home, Gledhow Hall. During the First World War, the house was converted into a Voluntary Aid Detachment hospital run by the Red Cross and the newly married Olive worked there as a nurse with Doris, a fellow Old Roedeanian. Catherine, Princess of Wales visited London's Imperial War Museum in 2018 to read records stating that her great-grandmother was "in residence"—on and off—as a VAD nurse at Gledhow Hall from May 1915 to April 1917. Olive remained involved with the VAD cause for many years.

She supported the Leeds branch of the Association for the Care and Protection of Friendless Girls which her grandmother Frances Lupton (née Greenhow) had helped establish in 1885. Also reportedly supporting the association was another of Frances's granddaughters, Elinor, as well as Baroness von Schunck (née Kate Lupton) and her daughter, the Hon. Mrs Albert Kitson (née Florence von Schunck, later Baroness Airedale), the respective niece and great-niece of Frances.

Olive's brother, Lionel Martineau Lupton attended Trinity College, Cambridge, at the same time as Diana, Princess of Wales's grandfather Albert Spencer, 7th Earl Spencer, where both men studied the same subject. They joined up together to fight in the Great War which saw Lionel and his two brothers killed. In April 1917, George V "commanded" that a letter be written to the brothers' father in which the King recognised the exceptional loss of "your gallant" sons.

Newton Park and Beechwood Estates
Members of Olive Middleton's family owned the Newton Park and Beechwood estates in Leeds, the latter being the family seat where, for decades, the "whole family would gather". The Lupton family are described in the Leeds City Council's photographic archive as "woollen manufacturers and landed gentry—a political and business dynasty"; Olive's first cousin-once-removed, Baroness von Schunck (née Kate Lupton), alongside her daughter and son-in-law, Baron and Baroness Airedale, had been invited to the coronation of King George V in 1911.

In 1891, Olive Middleton's grandmother Frances employed seven indoor servants, including a lady's maid at Beechwood; the estate's cottages housed gardeners, grooms, coachmen and a farm bailiff.

Her father, Francis Martineau Lupton, was the eldest son and heir of Francis Lupton III and grew up initially at Potternewton Hall on the family's Newton Park Estate and then their Georgian Beechwood Estate, in Roundhay. Whereas the family eventually sub-divided Newton Park, the Beechwood estate was entailed to Olive's eldest brother, Francis Ashford Lupton, who lacked a male heir. His death on 26 February 1917 followed the deaths of his two younger brothers—all First World War casualties. Their father's death occurred in 1921. Olive Middleton and her sister, Anne Lupton, inherited a portion of the Newton Park Estate but were prohibited from inheriting Beechwood and the estate succeeded to their father's brother, Arthur Greenhow Lupton. Arthur's only son, Major Arthur Michael Lupton, died in 1929 following an accident on his horse the previous year whilst fox hunting on the Bramham Moor Hunt, and Beechwood passed to his only son, Tom Lupton. As Tom was only nine at the time of his father's death, his spinster aunts, Elinor and Elizabeth—"The Misses Lupton"—were granted a life interest in Beechwood and continued to live there, occasionally opening their gardens to the public. After their deaths (Elizabeth in 1977 and Elinor in 1979), Tom inherited Beechwood and in 2016, his children continue to retain some of the estate.

City of Leeds dignitaries
On 2 September 1914, Lord Mayor Lord Brotherton announced that the Leeds City Council would be raising a new battalion: the Leeds Pals. His committee was composed of "City dignitaries" including Olive Middleton's father, alderman Francis Martineau Lupton and his brother Arthur Greenhow Lupton. The following year, they were filmed inspecting the Pals troops alongside another one of their brothers, Lord Mayor Sir Charles Lupton. Olive's first cousin, Lady Mayoress Elinor Lupton, regularly played host to the Princess Royal.

In the 1930s, both Noël Middleton and his first cousin, Major Arthur Daryl Middleton (1892–1962), were committee members of the Leeds Triennial Musical Festival. In 1942, Major Middleton was a member of the Trustees of the Patronage of Leeds Vicarage alongside Henry Lascelles, 6th Earl of Harewood. He was also a solicitor at Messrs Middleton & Sons.

Two of Olive Middleton's uncles were Lord Mayors of Leeds: Hugh Lupton and Sir Charles Lupton. Sir Charles also served as Deputy Lieutenant of Yorkshire County (West Riding), and his Lord Lieutenant was Princess Mary's father-in-law, Henry Lascelles, 5th Earl of Harewood.

Nursing
In 2018, Catherine, Princess of Wales, stated that her patronage of the Nursing Now campaign meant a lot to her personally as both her great-grandmother, Olive Middleton, and grandmother, Valerie Middleton, have been VAD nurses. In 2022, it was revealed that the duchess' great-great-aunt Gertrude Middleton was also a VAD nurse at Gledhow Hall, the home of Baroness Airedale, Olive's second cousin. Noël Middleton and his niece, Mrs Ronald Broughton Hopkins (née Margaret Middleton, 1900–1972), reportedly held honorary positions on various hospital and welfare-related committees in Leeds.

Ancestry

References

Further reading

External links
 Ancestry of the Duchess of Cambridge William Addams Reitwiesner and Michael J. Woods. 
 "Royal wedding: Family tree", BBC News, 13 April 2011
 The Ancestry of H.R.H. Catherine, Princess of Wales, by Anthony Adolph

Middleton
English gentry families
Family by person